Jorge David López Fernández (born 23 April 1956 in Turón, Asturias), known simply as David, is a Spanish retired footballer who played as a midfielder.

Honours
Sporting Gijón
Copa del Rey: Runner-up 1980–81, 1981–82

External links

1956 births
Living people
Footballers from Mieres, Asturias
Spanish footballers
Association football midfielders
La Liga players
Segunda División players
Segunda División B players
Tercera División players
Sporting de Gijón B players
Sporting de Gijón players
Zamora CF footballers
Levante UD footballers
Spain under-23 international footballers
Spain amateur international footballers
Spain B international footballers
Olympic footballers of Spain
Footballers at the 1980 Summer Olympics